Sir Richard Nagle, 2nd Baronet (12 August 1800 – 10 November 1850) was an Irish Member of Parliament.

Nagle lived at Jamestown House, in County Westmeath.  He was a magistrate, but was dismissed for presiding over a meeting that was held in opposition to tithes for the Anglican church.  At the 1832 UK general election, he stood in County Westmeath for the Repeal Association, and was elected.  He held his seat until the 1841 UK general election, when he stood down.

Nagle served a term as High Sheriff of Westmeath, and was also a deputy-lieutenant of the county.

References

1800 births
1850 deaths
Irish Repeal Association MPs
Members of the Parliament of the United Kingdom for County Westmeath constituencies (1801–1922)
People from County Westmeath
UK MPs 1832–1835
UK MPs 1835–1837
UK MPs 1837–1841